The Martin Lewis Money Show is a British current affairs show that has been broadcast on ITV since 25 September 2012, hosted by Martin Lewis. For the first six series the co-presenter was Saira Khan, and is currently co-presented by Angelica Bell. The show celebrated 100 regular episodes on 25 February 2021.

Format and broadcasting
Until 2020, regular episodes of the main series, shown on ITV is 30 minutes - and was a mix of filmed "roadshows" and up to date product and financial information. There are also 'Martin Lewis Money Show LIVE' specials, usually filmed in front of a live audience at various locations - where viewers can contact the show to ask questions during it. During 2020, a series of live special Coronavirus programmes were shown, which were so popular that an extended run of live shows began in September 2020, to run during term times until Easter 2021. Due to the show's popularity and good ratings, from October 2022 the length of each regular programme was extended to an hour.

Ratings
The main show receives ratings of 3 to 4m viewers, and most weeks heads the top 10 current affairs show ratings in Broadcast magazine.

Transmissions

Specials

Martin Lewis' Extreme Savers

References

External links
 

2012 British television series debuts
2010s British television series
2020s British television series
English-language television shows
ITV (TV network) original programming
Television series by ITV Studios